Johann Bahr, Bähr, or Baehr may refer to either of

 Johann Christian Felix Baehr, a German scholar
 Johann Beer, an Austrian composer and official